Jacob Henry "Buddy" Baer (June 11, 1915 – July 18, 1986) was an American boxer and later an actor with important parts in seventeen films, as well as roles on various television series in the 1950s and 1960s.

In 1941, he came extremely close to boxing stardom at Washington's Griffith Stadium, when in the opinion of most ringside officials, Joe Louis gave him a disqualifying late sixth-round hit in a title match that should have made Baer the world heavyweight champion. He lost to Louis in a rematch for the title the following year but remained solidly ranked among the top heavyweights in the early 1940s. In 2003, Baer was chosen for The Ring magazine's list of 100 greatest punchers of all time. He was the younger brother of boxing heavyweight champion and actor Max Baer, and the uncle of actor Max Baer Jr.

Boxing career
Baer was born in Denver, Colorado, on June 11, 1915, to father Jacob, a butcher, and mother Dora Bales. A few sources list his birthplace, like his brother Max, as Omaha, Nebraska. He moved with his family to California in 1928, living first in Livermore in 1926 and then Hayward, before settling in the early 1930s in Sacramento, where he would later retire. Both Buddy and his brother Max had a large Jewish following, for they claimed Jewish ancestry on their father's side and frequently wore a Star of David on their boxing trunks. Neither brother, however, appeared to be observant or openly religious, and their claims of Jewish heritage were questioned by legendary trainer Ray Arcel. Standing at 6' 6½" (1.99 m), Baer fought from 1934 to 1942 and was one of the best punchers of his era. Baer's manager during the largest portion of his boxing career was Ancil Hoffman, who also managed Max's career for a period.

Early career
In his professional debut, Baer knocked out Tiny Abbott, 1:54 into the first round on September 23, 1934, in Eureka, California. A boxer of some repute, the towering 6' 8" Abbott had twice faced Baer's brother Max, and though it was Baer's first time in the ring, the more experienced Abbott was nearing the end of his career. Baer had a long winning streak following his debut fight until he met Babe Hunt. On January 10, 1935, Baer was defeated in a four-round bout, losing on points to Hunt at Boston's Rickard Recreation Center. The loss was Baer's first in thirteen straight fights, twelve of which Baer won by knockout. Though Hunt had a bad second round, he came back strongly in the third and fourth to win by unanimous decision.

He completed a technical knockout of Jack O'Dowd at 2:10 into the second round at Detroit's Olympia Stadium on January 4, 1935. On a ticket that included Joe Louis, the total audience reached 15,853. The sizable crowd witnessed an exceptional performance from Baer, who outweighed his opponent by 29 pounds, less than his typical advantage. In an odd victory, O'Dowd, who seemed to lack the will to fight, was down five times in the first round, in a few instances without actually being hit.  Though O'Dowd had faced the great Joe Louis the previous year, he showed no desire to mix with Baer and appeared thoroughly outmatched. 

Frank Connolly, a former Golden Gloves champion, fell to Baer on March 20, 1935, in a convincing first-round knockout at the Oakland Auditorium before a substantial early-career crowd of 9,500. The final blow was a right hook that started low and came up with enormous power to knock out Connolly, who weighed 245, only a pound heavier than Baer.

Baer defeated Al Delaney on July 18, 1935, in a four-round knockout at Buffalo's Offerman Stadium. In a complete victory, Baer had Delaney down five times before the referee counted him out 34 seconds into the fourth round from a right behind the ear. In the opening round, Baer was knocked to his knees by a strong left, but he recovered, and had his own way for the rest of the match.

Match with Ford Smith
On the ticket of the Max Baer-Joe Louis match, he had one of his most lucrative bouts on September 4, 1935, when he lost a six-round wind-up match to Ford Smith in New York before an immense crowd of 90,000 fans at Yankee Stadium. Baer tried to overpower Smith in the early rounds with his legendary punching ability, but Smith moved, blocked and weathered the storm. In later rounds, Baer was less effective with intermittent looping blows that Smith countered with sharp, short punches to the body. Baer tired in the last round, and though he had an advantage in reach and weight, he did little damage in his final rally, having lost speed and precision in his blows. The more experienced Smith took four of the six rounds. According to one source, his purse for the match, which was the most heavily attended in New York history, was a remarkable $42,000. Louis, who won the title match against brother Max, had a purse of $200,000.

At this early stage of his career, Baer suffered a rare loss on April 22, 1936, dropping a six-round decision to Frenchman Andre Lenglet at Oakland's Municipal Auditorium. Baer looked strong in the first and had a brief promising rally in the fifth but lost his chance when Lenglet snapped back with a strong defense. One reporter, who wrote that Lenglet won each round by a large margin, noted that Baer failed to score with a telling blow throughout the match. Lenglet scored well with short left jabs to the face, and followups to the midriff and his frequent changes of pace confused Baer's ability to use his strong right.

In an important match on May 24, 1937, Baer outpointed Jack London, later the holder of the Commonwealth Boxing Council's Heavyweight title from 1944 to 1945. Baer won on points in a ten-round decision at Swansea, England, and though he had a significant advantage in height of nearly eight inches, he had only twenty pounds in weight over the sturdy London boxer. Two weeks earlier, Baer had defeated Jim Wilde at Harringay Arena in a fourth-round technical knockout. With clear dominance and impressive punching power, he had Wilde down three times in the first round and for a count of eight in the third. After being knocked to the canvas for a count of five in the opening of the fourth, the referee called the match. British rules required ending a bout after five knockdowns.

Match with top contender Abe Simon
He brought a stop to seasoned Jewish heavyweight Abe Simon before 25,000 fans, on August 30, 1937, scoring a technical knockout at Yankee Stadium in 2:38 of the third round. Though Simon punished Baer severely in the first and had him hanging from the ropes with a two-fisted attack, Baer rallied in the second with sharp left jabs and a stinging right cross and had Simon down and then staggering in the third when the referee called the fight. Both fighters had exceptional weight and reach and though Baer had a two-inch advantage in height, Simon, a giant himself, actually outweighed Baer by seven pounds.

Painful loss to Gunar Barlund
Baer lost to gifted Finnish boxer Gunnar Barlund on March 4, 1938, before 8,565 fans in a seventh-round technical knockout at Madison Square Garden. Baer had a forty-pound weight advantage over Barlund, and -inch advantage in height, but lacked stamina and heart as the fight progressed. Baer performed well in the first, cutting Barlund's forehead and nose with stinging left jabs and an occasional right, while Barlund lost points for low blows. In the second, however, Gunnar reached Baer with a few punches and then getting his range, took the second, third, and fourth. Baer maintained an edge in the fifth, and though both showed fatigue, Gunnar took the sixth, scoring at least ten straight rights and lefts without a return. In the seventh, Barlund drove Baer into the ropes with a heavy barrage. He followed him across the ring when Baer retreated and continued his attack, Baer seeming to give up, dropping his hands to his sides during the attack, and after coming from a clinch signaling the referee to end the fight. The referee asked Baer, apparently hurt, if he wished to continue, and decided to stop the fight, 1:36 into the seventh. Baer made no excuses for his performances but believed his layoff from the ring had affected his timing and ability to connect punches, particularly his right. Barlund successfully circled away from Baer's hard overhand right.

Three wins; Savold, Mann, and Blackshear
He defeated Lee Savold in an important match on October 30, 1939, in an eight-round newspaper decision before 3,500 in Des Moine, Iowa. After a brief exchange, Baer had his opponent down for a count of eight in the first round from a right uppercut, and though Savold battled hard in the remaining rounds, he struggled to connect blows after his rough first round. Most reporters gave five rounds to Baer with only two to Savold in the hotly contested match.

He defeated Nathan Mann on May 3, 1940, before 5000, in a seventh-round technical knockout at New York's Madison Square Garden. In the match, Baer took the first four rounds, but Mann took the next four with cutting hooks to the head and body. A savage right hook in the opening of the seventh severely cut Mann's eye, causing his handlers to end the fight.

Winning in a three-round technical knockout before 4,000 fans, he defeated accomplished boxer Harold Blackshear, who maintained a winning record and a 50% knockout percentage, on December 17, 1940, at Oakland's Auditorium. Baer had the advantages of roughly five inches in reach, 5.5 inches in height, and 49 pounds in weight, as well as his superior punching ability. He toyed with Blackshear for the first two-and-a-half rounds, before commencing a clubbing and brutal assault in the third that led to the end of the charity bout. Many at ringside considered the bout a mismatch. Although he pocketed $2,500 for the contest, Baer had faced stronger opposition in the recent past, as Blackshear had dropped his last two fights, suffering a loss and a strong knockout.

Loss to Eddie Blunt in Oakland
Baer lost to Eddie Blunt on January 15, 1941, at the Auditorium in Oakland in a ten-round points decision. Though Baer was a 3-1 favorite in the early betting, Blunt won eight of the ten rounds. Despite a weight disadvantage of twenty-four pounds, Blunt kept Baer off balance with long lefts and stiff uppercuts throughout the match, and by the fifth had cut Baer's eyes, after which Baer kept losing ground. The fifth through seventh rounds were hard fought with both boxers fighting toe to toe. Though Baer attempted a rally in the tenth, it was far too late to make up the points differential, though he managed to win the round. In the words of one reporter, "Baer took one of the most beautiful shellackings of his erratic career". Baer required stitches above both eyes, and it was evident he would need a break before his next fight.

In a ramp up to a heavyweight title match, he defeated colorful contender Tony Galento before 8,500 fans on April 8, 1941, in a seventh-round technical knockout in Washington D.C., when Galento had to discontinue the bout due to a broken hand. Galento took the first round backing Baer into the ropes with a few hard rights, but the second was even, and Baer took the remaining rounds. Baer used his superior reach in the remaining rounds to keep Galento from boring in, and in the fourth, he staggered Galento with a hard right to the mouth. Another solid blow in the sixth caused Galento to lose his mouthpiece, and there were some hard punches, but the match featured no knockdowns. The win was a solid one for Baer. Baer succeeded in connecting with solid lefts to Galento's head and both lefts and rights to his body.<ref>Buddy Baer Stops Tony, "Democrat and Chronicle, Rochester, New York, pg. 25, 9 April 1941.</ref>

World heavy title contender

The highlight of his boxing career came in his two attempts to take the heavyweight boxing championship from Joe Louis. In their first fight on May 23, 1941, Baer caught Louis with a powerful left hook in the first round and knocked the champion out of the ring. Louis, however, hurt but unfazed, climbed back in before the count of ten, though many ringside believed Louis benefited from a long count. Louis eventually won the fight on a disqualification after he had knocked down Baer three times in the sixth.  Baer claimed that his third knockdown came shortly after the bell had rung to end the sixth round. In the seventh, when Baer's handlers refused to leave the ring as they protested what they believed was a late hit in the sixth, the referee, Arthur Donovan, disqualified Baer in a technical knockout for not resuming the match. In a controversial decision, the referee believed the last hit came before or during the final bell, but most ringside officials, including the Official Timekeeper, Knockdown Timekeeper, and both judges believed the final blow came after the bell which should have disqualified Louis. The final decision of the boxing commissioner favored the referee, and Louis retained the title.  Regardless of the decision, many ringside believed Louis would have eventually won the fight, as he punished Baer repeatedly in the sixth, and had fully recovered from his knockdown in the first. Baer, nonetheless, came closer to defeating Louis and taking the title than any of the other opponents Louis would face, until losing to Ezzard Charles in 1950.The last hit came after the bell in Considine, Bob, "Buddy Baer Seen Dethroning Louis", Democrat and Chronicle, New York, New York, pg. 21, 25 May 1941.

In their rematch in Madison Square Garden, on January 9, 1942, before an estimated crowd of 19,000, Louis knocked Baer out in the first, after downing him two previous times. His second knockdown, after a barrage of blows and a thundering left hook, resulted in a count of nine. After rising to his feet again, Baer was battered around the ring and floored for the last time with a straight right to the head that put him down for a seven count. Unable to get up, the count was completed and the fight ended. Baer subsequently remarked, "The only way I could have beaten Louis that night was with a baseball bat."Cuddy, Jack, "Right-hand Blow Finished Buddy", Democrat and Chronicle, pg. 17, 10 January 1942. A year later he said, "I had to quit. I injured my neck in an auto crash before the fight".

Professional boxing record
All information in this section is derived from BoxRec, unless otherwise stated.

Official Record

All newspaper decisions are officially regarded as “no decision” bouts and are not counted in the win/loss/draw column.

Unofficial record

Record with the inclusion of newspaper decisions in the win/loss/draw column.

After boxing
Baer retired from boxing after the second Louis bout, and enlisted in the United States Army at McClellan Air Force Base in 1942, the early years of America's involvement in World War II.

With the war over, and his Army discharge complete in September 1945, he returned to Sacramento and started his most successful business, Buddy Baer's Bar of Music at 1411 11th Street, which he opened with Fred Cullincini.  He dabbled with less success in a variety of other businesses including a health food store, a clothing shop, heavy equipment sales and real estate. After his brother Max's death in 1959 of a heart ailment, he served as the national chairman for the Fraternal Order of Eagles Max Baer Heart Fund. He later worked as a Marshall or Sargeant-at-Arms for the California State Legislature in the 1970s. For a number of years he supported himself as a nightclub singer, putting his bass-baritone voice to use at such places as New York's Leon and Eddie's, and the Charles Club in Baltimore. He performed in 1952 with Pearl Bailey at the Paramount Theatre in New York.

Final years
Baer's last years were spent battling ailments that included diabetes, hypertension, and Alzheimer's disease. After a transfer from Sutter Memorial Hospital, he was admitted to the Martinez Veterans Hospital one week before his death and died on July 18, 1986 in Martinez, California. He was survived by his wife Vicki Farrell Brumbelow—whom he had married in 1964—a daughter Sheila, and three grandchildren. Baer had three previous marriages."Buddy Baer Dies", San Francisco Examiner, San Francisco, California, pg. 20, 19 July 1986 His body is buried in East Lawn Sierra Hills Memorial Park in Sacramento. Both Buddy and his brother Max were known as the "professional good guys" or "the genial giants". After their deaths, Sacramento sports reporter Billy Conlin wrote, "When they died, the 'sweet science' lost two of the sweetest!"

Partial filmography
 Take It from Me (1937) - Kid Brody
 Africa Screams (1949) - Boots Wilson
 Quo Vadis (1951) - Ursus, Lygia's bodyguard
 Two Tickets to Broadway (1951) - Sailor on Bus
 Flame of Araby (1951) - Hakim Barbarossa
 Jack and the Beanstalk (1952) - Sgt. Riley / The Giant
 The Big Sky (1952) - Romaine
 Fair Wind to Java (1953) - King
 Dream Wife (1953) - Vizier
 The Marshal's Daughter (1953) - Buddy Baer - Poker Game Player
 Jubilee Trail (1954) - Nicolai Gregorovitch Karakozeff 'Handsome Brute'
 Slightly Scarlet (1956) - Lenhardt
 Hell Canyon Outlaws (1957) - Henchman Stan
 Giant from the Unknown (1958) - Vargas the Giant
 Once Upon a Horse... (1958) - Beulah's Brother
 Snow White and the Three Stooges (1961) - Hordred
 The Magic Fountain (1961) - Big Benjamin (voice)
 The Bashful Elephant (1962) - Tavern Owner
 Ride Beyond Vengeance (1966) - Mr. Kratz (final film role)

Television
In 1957, Baer appeared in an episode of television's Gunsmoke, the episode entitled, "Never Pester Chester". In 1958, Baer appeared in an episode of the syndicated Adventures of Superman TV series, playing the role of Atlas, a circus strongman, who is duped by his fellow circus performers into stealing for them. They tell him that Superman is a crook and that he can help right the Man of Steel's wrongs by doing so.

In 1958, Baer appeared in Season 1 Episode 33 of Wagon Train, “The Daniel Hogan Story”. He played a boxer nicknamed “The Tinsmith”. 

Baer's other television credits included guest roles on the Adventures of Superman, Captain Midnight, Cheyenne, Circus Boy, Climax!, Have Gun – Will Travel, Peter Gunn, Rawhide, Sky King, Wagon Train, Tales of the Vikings, Toast of the Town, and in the adventure series Sheena, Queen of the Jungle. Baer’s most memorable character role was, perhaps, Stobo, on the aforementioned episode of Gunsmoke''.

References

External links

Baer Stops Galento in Seventh, Tony Claiming Broken Left Hand
Louis Wins in Seventh Round When Buddy Baer Is Disqualified by Referee
Louis Scores First-Round Knockout Over Buddy Baer in Charily Encounter; Louis Pounds Baer to Canvas Twice for 9-Counts Before Finishing Him in 2:56

1915 births
1986 deaths
20th-century American Jews
20th-century American male actors
American male boxers
American male film actors
American male television actors
American people of Czech-Jewish descent
Boxers from California
Boxers from Denver
Burials in California
Deaths from Alzheimer's disease
Deaths from diabetes
Deaths from hypertension
Heavyweight boxers
Jewish American boxers
Jewish American male actors
Male actors from California
Male actors from Denver
Military personnel from California
Military personnel from Colorado
Deaths from dementia in California
United States Army Air Forces personnel of World War II